Ochee Spring Quarry is an historic quarry in Johnston, Rhode Island.  Located on a privately owned outcrop of land behind 787 Hartford Avenue (United States Route 6), the quarry was a source of steatite (soapstone), a relatively soft stone easily workable into containers.  Native Americans are known to have used this quarry.  A study of the site conducted in the mid-1980s concluded that the quarry was probably worked in an organized manner, to produce containers in a variety of sizes.  Items made from this quarry have been found across southern New England.

The quarry was listed on the National Register of Historic Places in 1978.

See also
National Register of Historic Places listings in Providence County, Rhode Island

References

Quarries in the United States
Archaeological sites on the National Register of Historic Places in Rhode Island
Buildings and structures in Johnston, Rhode Island
National Register of Historic Places in Providence County, Rhode Island